Miller High School (MHS) is a public high school located in Corning, Ohio. Named after doctors Bob and Jim Miller, MHS opened in January 1964. It is the only secondary institution in the Southern Local School District, which was formed in 1961 with the consolidation of the Corning, Shawnee, Moxahala, and New Straitsville School Districts. The home of the falcons, Miller High School's official colors are purple and white. In 1993, a new building project  established the Miller Middle School and the Millcreek Elementary School on the same premises as Miller High School, bringing the entire campus under one roof.

Athletics

The Falcons belong to the Ohio High School Athletic Association (OHSAA) and were formerly members of the Tri-Valley Conference. In 2020, Miller joined the Mid-State League's Cardinal Division.

See also
 Ohio High School Athletic Conferences

References

External links
 Home page
 School district home page

Public high schools in Ohio
Public middle schools in Ohio
High schools in Perry County, Ohio